Rao Maldeo Rathore (5 December 1511 – 7 November 1562) was a king of the Marwar from the Rathore dynasty, who ruled the kingdom of Marwar in present day state of Rajasthan. Maldeo ascended the throne in 1531 CE, inheriting a small ancestral principality of Rathore's but after a long period of military actions against his neighbours, Maldeo swept significant territories which included parts of present day Rajasthan, Haryana, Uttar Pradesh, Gujarat and Sindh. He refused to ally with either the Sur Empire or the Mughal Empire. 

Maldeo's credential as a ruler were praised by several Persian chronicles of the time like Tabaaq-i-Akbari and Tarik-i-Ferishta composed by Nizammuddin and Ferishta who both acknowledged him as the most powerful monarch in Hindustan. 

Early life
Maldeo was born on 5 December 1511 as the eldest son of Rao Ganga, the Rathore ruler of Marwar. His mother, Rani Padma Kumari, was a princess from the Deora Chauhan kingdom of Sirohi. By the time he ascended the throne in 1531, Maldeo already enjoyed the reputation of being an intrepid warrior. Traditional and popular accounts list him amongst the most important rulers that Marwar has known.

Maldeo had supported his father in several campaigns. At an early age he defeated the rebels of Sojat and humbled Rao Veeram Dev of Merta by defeating him in battle. Maldeo later led a 4,000 strong army and helped Rana Sanga in the siege of Bayana on February 1527 and a month later at Khanwa. He personally led the charge on the left wing of the Mughal army and after the Rajput confederacy's defeat, he carried the wounded and unconscious Rana out of the battlefield. In 1529 the Rathore rebel Shekha and Khanzada Daulat Khan of Nagaur attacked Jodhpur, however Rao Ganga and Maldeo defeated this army and killed Shekha.

After Maldeo's participations in campaigns with his father and Rana Sanga and establishing his credential as a future monarch, he got overambitious and probably killed his father Ganga while he was drinking opium, by pushing him from the balcony. This is confirmed by Muhnot Nainsi in his chronicles. Later writers asserts that Ganga's fall was an accidental one due to opium effect without giving any conclusive evidence to save Maldeo from charge of Patricide.

Expansion
The rulers of Marwar once held sway over nine Rathore chieftains, however by the time Maldeo acceded to the throne, he ruled only two districts.  Maldeo thus attacked these nine chieftains and changed Marwars stance of overlordship to absolute control. Maldeo also defeated the Sindhals of Raipur and Bhadrajun and fortified the two cities. In 1534 Maldeo attacked Nagaur and forced Daulat Khan to flee to Ajmer. Maldeo soon attacked Merta, Rian and Ajmer and captured them. The petty lords of Didwana and Pachpadra also acknowledged Maldeo's suzerainty. His attack on Jaisalmer was also successful and it brought the Bhatti rulers under his sway. In 1538 He defeated Mahecha Rathores and annexed Siwana and sent Bida Rathore to attack Jalore and captured Sultan Sikandar Khan. The Sultan was imprisoned and died after a short period in captivity. Maldeo, after capturing Jalore attacked and annexed Sanchore, Bhinmal, Radhanpur and Nabhara (In Gujarat). Maldeo's western territory at this time extended up to Sindh-Cholistan in the west and parts of Gujarat in the south-west. He had direct control over 40 districts in and around present day Rajasthan. In 1539 Maldeo took advantage of the war between the Mughals and the Sur Empire to conquer Bayana, Tonk and Toda.

By regaining territories from Afghan occupation, Maldeo Rathore restored Hindu rule in the area and abolished the Jizya tax there. His northern boundary at Jhajjar was only about fifty kilometers from Delhi.

According to Satish Chandra, "Maldeo's kingdom  almost the whole of western and eastern Rajasthan including Sambhal and Narnaul (In Haryana). His armies could be seen as far as the outskirts of Agra. Chandra also says that, Maldeo had the mirage of reviving the 8th century Rashtrakuta empire. But unlike Prithviraj Chauhan and Rana Sanga Maldeo did not have the support of the Rajput tribes and politically no empire based in Rajasthan alone could challenge or defeat an empire that stretched from Punjab to the Upper Ganga valley." This was pointing towards Maldeo's hope of competing with the Mughal and Sur empires.

Rathore Kingdom
After a prolong period of Wars, Maldeo swept significant territories from his neighbours and expanded Marwar kingdom. At its Zenith, Maldeo kingdom stretched almost till Delhi and Agra, his eastern boundaries included Hindaun, Bayana, Fatehpur Sikri (Uttar Pradesh) and Mewat (Haryana). His influence also extended deep into Sindh in northwest and up to Gujarat in South. 

Reign
Rao Maldeo took advantage of the Mewari civil war and invaded Mewar. He established a garrison at Jaunpur (in Mewar) and annexed the lands of Sambhar, Kalsi, Fatehpur, Rewasa, Chota-Udaipur, Chatsu, Lawan and Malwarana. It was during this time that the Sisodia nobles asked Maldeo to aid them against Banbir. The combined Rathor-Sisodia army defeated Banbir and secured the throne for Udai Singh II. Maldeo continued to take advantage of the war and used the situation to form military posts in Mewar, Bundi and Ranthambore. This led to a bitter rivalry between Udai Singh II and Maldeo Rathore.The Quarterly Journal of the Mythic Society (Bangalore, India)., Volume 62. p. 24

Rao Maldeo and Humayun
Maldeo Rathore had made an alliance with the Mughal emperor Humayun against Sher Shah Suri. But shortly after Humayun was defeated in the battles of Chausa and Kannauj by the Afghan emperor. Humayun upon losing most of his territories turned to Maldeo for help and was called to Marwar for refuge by the Rao. According to Rajput sources, Mughals killed several cows on the way to Marwar, this made the local Rajputs hostile towards Humayun as cows were sacred to the Hindus. Humayun was thus forced to flee from Marwar. The Mughal sources however blame Maldeo for betrayal and say that Maldeo breached the alliance because he was given more favourable terms by Sher Shah. according to Satish Chandra - "Maldeo invited him, but seeing the small size of his following, set his face against him" Chandra also says that Maldeo could have arrested Humayun but he refrained as he was an invited guest.

War with Jaisalmer
Maldeo Rathore was expanding his territories westward and besieged Jaisalmer in 1537. Rawal Lunkaran was forced to sue for peace by giving Maldeo his daughter Umade Bhattiyani in marriage to him..Through this alliance Maldeo was able to secure his western borders and employ a large number of Bhati rajputs from Jaisalmer.

War with Bikaner
Bikaner was a Rathore kingdom situated towards the north of Marwar. Relations between Marwar and Bikaner had been bitter since the time of Bikaners foundation by Rao Bika. Rao Maldeo used a minor border dispute as a pretext for war and fought a battle with Rao Jaitsi in 1542 at the battle of Sohaba, Rao Jaitsi was killed in battle and Rao Maldeo took advantage of this situation to annex the entire kingdom of Bikaner.

War with the Sur Empire

A Marital alliance with Jaisalmer secured Marwars western borders but Maldeo was fiercely opposed by the dispossessed chiefs of Bikaner and Merta who made an alliance with the Sur emperor, Sher Shah Suri, of Delhi against Marwar. According to The Cambridge History of India – "Shershah invaded Marwar with an army of 80,000 horsemen but he still hesitated to attack the Rathore army of 50,000 horsemen". He thus forged letters and deceived Maldeo into abandoning his commanders to their fate. Jaita and Kumpa, the two commanders of Maldeo refused to retreat and gave battle to Afghans near. With a small force of 5000-6,000 they vigorously attacked Sher Shah's centre and created confusion in his army. Soon overwhelming numbers and Afghan gunfire halted the Rajput charge. According to Satish Chandra - Sher Shahs oft quoted remark " I had given away the country of Delhi for a handful of millets" is a tribute to the gallantry of Jaita and Kumpa and the willingness of the Rajputs to face death even in the face of impossible odds. After this Battle of Sammel, Khawas Khan Marwat and Isa Khan Niyazi took possession of Jodhpur and occupied the territory of Marwar from Ajmer to Mount Abu in 1544. However, Maldeo reoccupied his lost territories in 1545.The Cambridge History of India pp. 54–55

War with Amer
Rao Maldeo defeated Bharmal and captured four districts of the Amer kingdom. Bharmal in order to save himself sought help from Haji Khan Sur.

Battle of Harmoda
Haji Khan was a slave of Sher Shah Suri and became the lord of Ajmer and Nagaur after the Battle of Sammel. Maldeo who was on a resurgence to win back his lost territories attacked Haji, however the States of Mewar and Bikaner came to Haji's aid and forced Maldeo to retreat. The relations between Haji and Udai Singh II deteriorated quickly, according to one account it was due to the demand of a dancing girl by Udai Singh in return for his help against Maldeo. Udai Singh threatened Haji for war upon which he fled to the refuge of Maldeo and together their armies defeated Udai Singh on January 1557 in the Battle of Harmoda. Maldeo captured the fortified city of Merta after the battle. Maldeo further invaded Amber and forced the Kachwaha Raja to become a feudatory of Marwar.

Mughal Invasions
Akbar succeeded Humayun in 1556,  Many Rajput chiefs mustered around him with their grievances against the Rathore Chief of Jodhpur. Akbar used this as a casus belli against Maldeo and sent several expeditions against Marwar. The Mughals conquered Ajmer and Nagaur in 1557 and soon after Akbar captured Jaitaran and Parbatsar. However the Mughals failed to capture the core territories of Marwar. Maldeo before his death held the districts of Jodhpur, Sojat, Jaitaran, Phalodi, Siwana, Pokhran, Jalore, Sanchore, Merta, Barmer, Kotra and some parts of Jaisalmer. These territories were later captured by Akbar due to the succession war between Maldeo's sons.G.R. Parihar,Marwar and the Marathas: 1724–1843 A.D. p. xiii

Death and succession
Maldeo Rathore had named his younger son, Chandrasen Rathore as his successor but after Maldeo's death on 7 November 1562, a fratricidal contest began for the throne of Marwar.Sarkar, J.N. (1984, reprint 1994). A History of Jaipur, New Delhi: Orient Longman, p. 41

In popular culture
 2013–2015: Bharat Ka Veer Putra – Maharana Pratap'', broadcast by Sony Entertainment Television (India), where he was portrayed by Surendra Pal.

Notes

References

External links

Monarchs of Marwar
1511 births
1562 deaths
16th-century Indian monarchs